Dichanthelium is genus of flowering plants of the grass family, Poaceae. They are known commonly as rosette grasses and panicgrasses.

Taxonomy
Formerly a subgenus of the genus Panicum, Dichanthelium was elevated to genus status in 1974. Its species are still treated as members of Panicum by some authorities, because the two genera are very similar in form. Molecular data support the recognition of Dichanthelium as a separate genus.

The name Dichanthelium originates from the Greek for "twice-flowering", in reference to the vernal and autumnal growth phases.

Description
These are perennial grasses, sometimes with rhizomes. The grasses may overwinter as rosettes of short, wide leaves and then produce longer, wider leaves on the stem during spring. They produce hollow stems a few centimeters tall to well over one meter. They are upright to erect when new, then sometimes sprawling, spreading, and bending as the season progresses. The upper stems may have a few main branches that divide into smaller branches bearing panicles. There are primary panicles, which may be chasmogamous, and secondary panicles, which are often cleistogamous. The spikelets are roughly 1 to 5 millimeters long and lack awns.

In the Chicago area, Dichanthelium is considered the most emblematic genus of the Gulf and Atlantic coastal plain disjunct habitat found in that region.

Species
There are about 72 species in the genus. Species include:

Dichanthelium aciculare (Desv. ex Poir.) Gould & C.A.Clark – needleleaf rosette grass, narrow-leaved panicgrass
Dichanthelium acuminatum (Sw.) Gould &C.A. Clark – tapered rosette grass, hotsprings rosette grass, hairy panicgrass
Dichanthelium adenorhachis (Zuloaga & Morrone) Zuloaga
Dichanthelium aequivaginatum (Swallen) Zuloaga
Dichanthelium albomaculatum (Scribn.) Gould
Dichanthelium angustifolium (Elliott) Gould
Dichanthelium annulum (Ashe) LeBlond
Dichanthelium assurgens (Renvoize) Zuloaga
Dichanthelium boreale (Nash) Freckmann – northern panicgrass
Dichanthelium boscii (Poir.) Gould & C.A.Clark – Bosc's panicgrass
Dichanthelium cabrerae (Zuloaga & Morrone) Zuloaga
Dichanthelium caerulescens (Hack. ex Hitchc.) Correll
Dichanthelium caparoense (Zuloaga & Morrone) Zuloaga
Dichanthelium chamaelonche (Trin.) Freckmann & Lelong – small-seeded panicgrass
Dichanthelium clandestinum (L.) Gould – deertongue
Dichanthelium columbianum (Scribn.) Freckmann
Dichanthelium commonsianum (Ashe) Freckmann
Dichanthelium commutatum (Schult.) Gould – variable panicgrass
Dichanthelium congestum (Renvoize) Zuloaga
Dichanthelium conjugens (Skottsb.) C.A.Clark & Gould
Dichanthelium cordovense (E.Fourn.) Davidse
Dichanthelium cucaense (Zuloaga & Morrone) Zuloaga
Dichanthelium cumbucana (Renvoize) Zuloaga
Dichanthelium cynodon (Reichardt) C.A.Clark & Gould – tussock panicgrass
Dichanthelium davidsei (Zuloaga & Morrone) Zuloaga
Dichanthelium depauperatum (Muhl.) Gould – starved panicgrass
Dichanthelium dichotomum (L.) Gould – cypress panicgrass, forked panicgrass
Dichanthelium ensifolium (Baldwin ex Elliott) Gould – sword-leaf panicgrass
Dichanthelium forbesii (Hitchc.) C.A. Clark & Gould
Dichanthelium fusiforme (Hitchc.) Harvill
Dichanthelium hebotes (Trin.) Zuloaga
Dichanthelium heliophilum (Chase ex Zuloaga & Morrone) Zuloaga
Dichanthelium hillebrandianum (Hitchc.) C.A.Clark & Gould – bog rosette grass
Dichanthelium hirstii (Swallen) Kartesz – Hirst's panicgrass
Dichanthelium implicatum (Scribn.) Kerguélen
Dichanthelium isachnoides (Munro ex Hillebrand) C.A.Clark & Gould – Maui rosette grass
Dichanthelium itatiaiae (Swallen) Zuloaga
Dichanthelium joori (Vasey) Mohlenbr.
Dichanthelium koolauense (H.St.John & Hosaka) C.A.Clark & Gould – Koolau rosette grass
Dichanthelium lanuginosum (Elliott) Gould
Dichanthelium latifolium (L.) Harvill – broadleaf rosette grass
Dichanthelium laxiflorum (Lam.) Gould – openflower rosette grass, soft-tufted panicgrass
Dichanthelium leibergii (Vasey) Freckmann – Leiberg's rosette grass
Dichanthelium leucoblepharis (Trin.) Gould & C.A.Clark
Dichanthelium lindheimeri (Nash) Gould
Dichanthelium linearifolium (Scribn.) Gould – slimleaf rosette grass, linear-leaved panicgrass
Dichanthelium lucidum (Ashe) LeBlond
Dichanthelium macrospermum Gould
Dichanthelium malacophyllum (Nash) Gould – softleaf rosette grass
Dichanthelium mattamuskeetense (Ashe) Mohlenbr.
Dichanthelium microcarpon (Muhl. ex Elliott) Mohlenbr.
Dichanthelium nitidum (Lam.) Mohlenbr.
Dichanthelium nodatum (Hitchc. & Chase) Gould – Sarita rosette grass
Dichanthelium nudicaule (Vasey) B.F. Hansen & Wunderlin – naked-stemmed panicgrass
Dichanthelium oligosanthes (Schult.) Gould – Heller's rosette grass, fewanther obscuregrass, few-flowered panicgrass
Dichanthelium ovale (Elliott) Gould & C.A.Clark – eggleaf rosette grass, stiff-leaved panicgrass
Dichanthelium pantrichum (Hack.) Davidse
Dichanthelium pedicellatum (Vasey) Gould – cedar rosette grass, corm-based panicgrass
Dichanthelium peristypum (Zuloaga & Morrone) Zuloaga
Dichanthelium perlongum (Nash) Freckmann – long-stalked panicgrass
Dichanthelium petropolitanum (Zuloaga & Morrone) Zuloaga
Dichanthelium polyanthes (Schult.) Mohlenbr. – many-flowered panicgrass
Dichanthelium portoricense (Desv. ex Ham.) B.F.Hansen & Wunderlin – blunt-glumed panicgrass
Dichanthelium pycnoclados (Tutin) Davidse
Dichanthelium ravenelii (Scribn. & Merr.) Gould – Ravenel's rosette grass
Dichanthelium sabulorum (Lam.) Gould & C.A.Clark – hemlock rosette grass
Dichanthelium scabriusculum (Elliott) Gould & C.A.Clark – woolly rosette grass, tall-swamp panicgrass
Dichanthelium sciurotis (Trin.) Davidse
Dichanthelium sciurotoides (Zuloaga & Morrone) Davidse
Dichanthelium scoparioides (Ashe) Mohlenbr.
Dichanthelium scoparium (Lam.) Gould – velvet panicum
Dichanthelium scribnerianum (Nash) Gould
Dichanthelium sendulskyii (Zuloaga & Morrone) Zuloaga
Dichanthelium sphaerocarpon (Elliott) Gould – roundseed panicgrass, round-fruited panicgrass
Dichanthelium sphagnicola (Nash) LeBlond
Dichanthelium stigmosum (Trin.) Zuloaga
Dichanthelium stipiflorum (Renvoize) Zuloaga
Dichanthelium strigosum (Muhl. ex Elliott) Freckmann – roughhair rosette grass, cushion-tuft panicgrass
Dichanthelium superatum (Hack.) Zuloaga
Dichanthelium surrectum (Chase ex Zuloaga & Morrone) Zuloaga
Dichanthelium telmatum (Swallen) Zuloaga
Dichanthelium umbonulatum (Swallen) Davidse
Dichanthelium viscidellum (Scribn.) Gould
Dichanthelium wilcoxianum (Vasey) Freckmann – fall rosette grass, Wilcox's panicgrass
Dichanthelium xalapense Kunth
Dichanthelium xanthophysum (A. Gray) Freckmann – slender rosette grass, pale panicgrass
Dichanthelium yadkinense (Ashe) Mohlenbr.

References

 
Poaceae genera